Gorno Konjare is a village in the municipality of Kumanovo, North Macedonia.

Demographics
According to the statistics of Bulgarian ethnographer Vasil Kanchov from 1900 the settlement is recorded as Kojnare Gorno as having 224 inhabitants, all Christian Bulgarians. According to the 2002 census, the village had a total of 1136 inhabitants. Ethnic groups in the village include:

Macedonians 555
Serbs 324
Albanians 255
Others 2

References

External links

Villages in Kumanovo Municipality
Albanian communities in North Macedonia